This is a list of Spanish football transfers for the 2013–14 season of La Liga and the Segunda División. Only moves from La Liga and the Segunda División are listed.

The summer transfer window began on 1 July 2013, although a few transfers took place prior to that date. The window closed at midnight on 2 September 2013. Players without a club could join one at any time, either during or in between transfer windows. Clubs below La Liga level could also sign players on loan at any time. If need be, clubs could sign a goalkeeper on an emergency loan, if all others were unavailable.

Where there is no flag, the player or club can be assumed to be Spanish or affiliated to the Royal Spanish Football Federation.

Summer 2013 La Liga transfer window

See also
List of Spanish football transfers winter 2013–14

References

Spanish
2013
2013
Transfers
2013